Lee F Melville (born 20 May 1970) is a Bahamian cricketer. Melville is a right-handed batsman who bowls right-arm medium pace and currently represents the Bahamas national cricket team.

Prior to representing the Bahamas, Melville played for Caistor Cricket Club in England in the Lincolnshire Premier League from 2001 to 2002.

Melville made his debut for the Bahamas in the 2006 ICC Americas Championship Division 2 against Panama.

Melville made his Twenty20 debut for the Bahamas against Jamaica in the 1st round of the 2008 Stanford 20/20.  Melville claimed the wicket of Shawn Findlay.

Meville represented the Bahamas in the 2010 ICC World Cricket League Division Five and the 2010 ICC Americas Championship Division 2.  Melville's final match for the Bahamas came against Suriname.

References

External links
Lee Melville at Cricinfo
Lee Melville at CricketArchive

1970 births
Living people
Bahamian cricketers